James "Bonnor" Middleton (30 September 1865 – 23 December 1913) was a South African cricketer who played in six Tests from 1896 to 1902. On his debut, he took five wickets in the first innings against England in Port Elizabeth in 1896.

Middleton served in the British Army until Cape Town Cricket Club bought his release so he could become their professional. A left-arm slow-medium opening bowler, Middleton played for Western Province from 1890–91 to 1903–04. His best first-class figures were 7 for 64 in the Currie Cup final against Transvaal in 1897–98. He took 12 for 100 in the match, which Western Province won. 

Middleton was one of the leading players on South Africa's tour of England in 1894 when no Tests were played; in the South Africans' narrow victory over MCC at Lord's he bowled unchanged through both innings to take 6 for 48 and 6 for 35.
 
His nickname was given because of his resemblance, as a hard-hitting batsman, to the Australian Test cricketer George Bonnor. He died in Cape Town of heart failure after severe attacks of asthma and bronchitis.

See also
 List of South Africa cricketers who have taken five-wicket hauls on Test debut

References

External links
 Bonnor Middleton at CricketArchive
 

1865 births
1913 deaths
South Africa Test cricketers
South African cricketers
Western Province cricketers
Sportspeople from Chester-le-Street
Cricketers from County Durham
Cricketers who have taken five wickets on Test debut